Bray Hammond (November 20, 1886 – July 20, 1968) was an American financial historian and assistant secretary to the Board of Governors of the Federal Reserve System in 1944–1950. He won the 1958 Pulitzer Prize for History for Banks and Politics in America from the Revolution to the Civil War (1957).  He was educated at Stanford University.

Books 
 Banks and Politics in America from the Revolution to the Civil War (Princeton University Press, 1957)
 Sovereignty and an Empty Purse: Banks and Politics in the Civil War (Princeton, 1970)

References

External links 
 
 The Papers of Bray Hammond at Dartmouth College Library

 

1886 births
1968 deaths
20th-century American historians
American male non-fiction writers
American social sciences writers
Pulitzer Prize for History winners
Writers from Springfield, Missouri
20th-century American male writers